The A List is a British teen thriller television series created by Dan Berlinka and Nina Metivier, released on BBC iPlayer on 25 October 2018. The central character is Mia (Lisa Ambalavanar), who arrives at a summer camp on an island that turns out to hold dark secrets. The series was released internationally on Netflix on 30 August 2019. In December 2019, the BBC pulled out of the project and it was announced that the series would move to Netflix for the second series. The second series premiered on Netflix on 25 June 2021.

Cast
 Lisa Ambalavanar as Mia
 Ellie Duckles as Amber
 Savannah Baker as Kayleigh
 Cian Barry as Dave (main series 1; guest series 2)
 Eleanor Bennett as Jenna
 Jacob Dudman (Series 1) and Barnaby Tobias (Series 2–present) as Dev
 Benjamin Nugent as Harry
 Rosie Dwyer as Alex
 Jack Kane as Zac
 Max Lohan as Luka
 Nneka Okoye as Mags (series 1)
 Micheal Ward as Brendan (main series 1; guest series 2)
 Georgina Sadler as Petal
 Indianna Ryan as Midge
 Dylan Brady as Sam Sutherland (series 2)
 Byron Easman as Fitz (series 2)
 Finty Williams as Dr. Shaw (series 2)
 Abbie Hirst as Dr Kelman

Episodes

Series overview

Series 1 (2018)

Series 2 (2021)

References

External links
 
 
 

2018 British television series debuts
2010s British drama television series
2010s British mystery television series
2010s British teen television series
2010s teen drama television series
2020s British drama television series
2020s British mystery television series
2020s British teen television series
2020s teen drama television series
British teen drama television series
British thriller television series
English-language Netflix original programming
Television series by Kindle Entertainment
Television series about summer camps
Television series about teenagers
Television shows filmed in the United Kingdom
Television shows set on islands